Tewkesbury Borough Council is the local authority for the Borough of Tewkesbury in Gloucestershire, England. The whole council is elected together every four years. Since the last boundary changes in 2019, a total of 38 councillors have been elected from 20 wards.

Political control
Since the first election to the council in 1973 political control of the council has been held by the following parties:

Leadership
The leaders of the council since 2007 have been:

Council elections
1973 Tewkesbury Borough Council election
1976 Tewkesbury Borough Council election
1979 Tewkesbury Borough Council election
1983 Tewkesbury Borough Council election (New ward boundaries)
1987 Tewkesbury Borough Council election
1991 Tewkesbury Borough Council election (New ward boundaries & borough boundary changes also took place)
1995 Tewkesbury Borough Council election
1999 Tewkesbury Borough Council election
2003 Tewkesbury Borough Council election (New ward boundaries)
2007 Tewkesbury Borough Council election
2011 Tewkesbury Borough Council election
2015 Tewkesbury Borough Council election
2019 Tewkesbury Borough Council election

By-election results

References

External links

 
Borough of Tewkesbury
Council elections in Gloucestershire
District council elections in England